Palakasandha is a village in Khetriyabarapur panchayat of Belaguntha Block in Ganjam district, Odisha, India.

The population is approximately 1,000. Most of the people in this village depend on agriculture. Sri. Antaryami Behara is the Sarpanch of the village. Nilakanthaswar is the noted temple of this village.

Streets of the Village:

Bada Sahi 
Mali Sahi
Adua Sahi 
Jakara Sahi 
Khadal Sahi

Ponds in the Village
Aketa Bandha
Majhi Aketa Bandha
Bada Agula
Agula Bandha
Daula Bandha 
Nelia Bandha

Community Halls:

There are two community halls in the village: "Mali Sahi Akeda Ghar" and "Bada Sahi Akheda Ghar."

The Raja Nata (The King's Opera)

Palakadandha is famous for its Raja Nata performed by village residents. Sometimes, they perform it at other villages 

Villages in Ganjam district